{{DISPLAYTITLE:C18H30}}
The molecular formula C18H30 (molar mass: 246.44 g/mol, exact mass: 246.2348 u) may refer to:

 Dodecylbenzene
 Estrane